Nudaria fumidisca is a moth of the subfamily Arctiinae first described by George Hampson in 1896. It is found in the Indian states of Sikkim and Assam.

References

Nudariina